Francisco Sein was a Puerto Rican politician and senator.

In 1917, Sein was elected as a member of the first Puerto Rican Senate established by the Jones-Shafroth Act. He represented the District III (Aguadilla).

He entered the Provincial Institute of San Juan, where he graduated with honor with the degree of baccalaureate in Arts. He enrolled later at the University of Zaragoza in Spain, where he graduated in 1893, and studied postgraduate studies at the Central University of Madrid. Was appointed Titular Physician of Añasco. He was also prominent in educational matters and for eight years served as President of the Lares School Board. A housing project in Lares has his name.

References

Members of the Senate of Puerto Rico
People from Añasco, Puerto Rico
University of Zaragoza alumni
1870 births
Year of death missing